The International Union of Pure and Applied Physics (IUPAP ) is an international non-governmental organization whose mission is to assist in the worldwide development of physics, to foster international cooperation in physics, and to help in the application of physics toward solving problems of concern to humanity. It was established in 1922 and the first General Assembly was held in 1923 in Paris. The Union is domiciled in Geneva, Switzerland.

IUPAP carries out this mission by: sponsoring international meetings; fostering communications and publications; encouraging research and education; fostering the free circulation of scientists; promoting international agreements on the use of symbols, units, nomenclature and standards; and cooperating with other organizations on disciplinary and interdisciplinary problems.

IUPAP is a member of the International Science Council.

IUPAP is the lead organization promoting the adoption of the International Year of Basic Sciences for Sustainable Development, a proposal to be considered by the 76th session of the UN General Assembly.

History
In 1919 was formed the International Research Council “largely through the representatives of the National Academy of Sciences, Washington, and of the Royal Society, London, to coordinate international efforts in the different branches of sciences, under whose aegis international associations or unions in different branches of science could be formed".

In accordance with this principle, the 1922 General Assembly of the IRC convened at Brussels and a number of physicists present decided that the formation of a Physics Union was imperative.

Thirteen countries (Belgium, Canada, Denmark, France, Netherlands, Empire of Japan, Norway, Poland, Spain, Switzerland, United Kingdom, United States and Union of South Africa) immediately announced their adherence to the new Union.

An Executive committee was formed which undertook to prepare rules, regulations, and activities of the organization. The committee consisted of ten distinguished physicists:- W.H. Bragg, M. Brillouin, O.M. Corbino, M. Knudsen, M. Leblanc, R.A. Millikan, H. Nagaoka, E. Van Aubel, and H. Abraham. The committee had Bragg as President, Van Aubel as Vice-President, and Abraham as Secretary.

This was the birth of the International Union of Pure and Applied Physics.

Committees and governance 
The Union is governed by its General Assembly, which meets every three years. The Council is its top executive body, supervising the activities of the nineteen specialized International Commissions and the four Affiliated Commissions – it typically meets once or twice per year. The Union is composed of Members representing identified physics communities. At present 60 Members adhere to IUPAP. The Members are represented by Liaison Committees.  Members of the Council and Commissions are elected by the General Assembly, based on nominations received from Liaison Committees and existing Council and Commission members.

The IUPAP specialised Commissions are:

C1. Commission on Policy and Finance

C2. Commission on Symbols, Units, Nomenclature, Atomic Masses & Fundamental Constants

C3. Commission on Statistical Physics

C4. Commission on Astroparticle Physics. The commission was previously known as the Commission on Cosmic Rays.

C5. Commission on Low Temperature Physics

C6. Commission on Biological Physics

C8. Commission on Semiconductors

C9. Commission on Magnetism

C10. Commission on the Structure and Dynamics of Condensed Matter

C11. Commission on Particles and Fields

C12. Commission on Nuclear Physics

C13. Commission on Physics for Development

C14. Commission on Physics Education

C15. Commission on Atomic, Molecular, and Optical Physics

C16. Commission on Plasma Physics

C17. Commission on Laser Physics and Photonics

C18. Commission on Mathematical Physics

C19. Commission on Astrophysics

C20. Commission on Computational Physics

The Affiliated Commissions are:

AC.1. International Commission for Optics

AC.2. International Commission on General Relativity and Gravitation

AC.3. International Commission for Acoustics

AC.4. International Commission on Medical Physics

In addition IUPAP has established a number of Working Groups to provide an overview of important areas of international collaboration in physics.

Sponsored conferences 
Each year, IUPAP endorses approximately 30 international conferences and awards grants to the majority of them. Applications for sponsorship can be made via the IUPAP website.

Sponsored conferences fall into four categories:

General Conferences - Type A

These provide a broad overview of an entire field (typically the field of interest to a Commission), and normally occur at two- or three-year intervals, as advances in the field warrant. Attendance in the range of 750-1000 would be anticipated.

Topical Conferences - Type B

These concentrate on broad sub-fields (e.g. nuclear spectroscopy, nuclear reaction mechanisms, heavy ion physics, are possible sub-fields in the field of Nuclear Physics). They would normally be scheduled in the years between the corresponding Type A General conferences. Attendance in the range of 300-600 individuals would be anticipated.

Special Conferences - Type C

These concentrate on much more specialised topics than in the case of Type B Conferences (e.g. angular correlations, lifetime measurements, neutron resonance studies in the field of Nuclear Physics). Attendance in the range of 50-200 would be anticipated.

Workshops in Developing Countries - Type D

These concentrate on meeting the needs of a developing region. Unlike the Type A, B and C conferences, they do not need to be truly international, but should involve neighbouring countries, and they should address the needs of the region. One Type D conference will be approved each year. All applications for Type-D Conferences must be submitted to the Commission on Physics for Development (C13).

Sponsored awards 
IUPAP commissions sponsor various awards for scientists. These include:

 The IUPAP Young Scientist Prize, approved and adopted at the 2005 General Assembly for all commissions. The prize was renamed Early Career Scientist Prize at the General Assembly 2021. 
 The SUNAMCO Medal, given by the Commission on Symbols, Units, Nomenclature, Atomic Masses and Fundamental Constants (C2) 
 The Boltzmann Medal, awarded by the Commission on Statistical Physics (C3) 
 The Fritz London Award, given by the Commission on Low Temperature Physics (C5)  
 The Young Author Best Paper Award, established by the Commission on Semiconductors (C8) and sponsored by the semiconductor industries of USA, Japan and Europe 
 ICM Award in Magnetism, established by the Commission on Magnetism (C9) 
 The ICPE Medal, sponsored by the Commission on Physics Education (C14) 
 Penning Award Excellence in Low-Temperature Plasma Physics, established by the Commission on Plasma Physics (C16)
 ICO Prize, awarded by the Affiliated Commission for Optics (AC1)  
 ICO Galileo Galilei Award, awarded by the Affiliated Commission for Optics (AC1)

Sponsored symposiums
 Symposium on Laser Physics

Member States of IUPAP 

IUPAP was founded  by 13 states:- Belgium, Canada, Denmark, France, Netherlands, Empire of Japan, Norway, Poland, Spain, Switzerland, United Kingdom, United States and Union of South Africa in 1922. Since then many new members have joined the union.Today the IUPAP consists of 56 member states.

Below is the list of Member States of IUPAP:-

List of IUPAP Presidents 

The IUPAP President is the head of the Executive Council. IUPAP Presidents are elected by the General Assembly. During the election of the Executive Council, the future President is also elected to the post of President-Designate. Thus in every Executive Council the current President-Designate will succeed the incumbent President.

Below is the list of IUPAP Presidents since its inception in 1922.

See also
 International Union of Pure and Applied Chemistry

References

External links
 International Union of Pure and Applied Physics
 IUPAP 'Red Book'

Members of the International Council for Science
International scientific organizations
International organisations based in Switzerland
Physics organizations
International learned societies
Standards organisations in Singapore
Scientific organizations established in 1922
Members of the International Science Council